Antonio Albanese (5 December 1937 – 16 June 2013) was an Italian fencer. He competed in the team épée event at the 1968 Summer Olympics and finished in sixth place.

References

1937 births
2013 deaths
Italian male fencers
Olympic fencers of Italy
Fencers at the 1968 Summer Olympics
Fencers from Milan